Heringia pubescens is a European species of hoverfly.

References

Diptera of Europe
Pipizinae
Insects described in 1955